The Sir Douglas Robb Lectures are a lecture series that have existed at the University of Auckland in New Zealand since 1968. The series is named in honor of Sir Douglas Robb, and is noted for producing physicist Richard Feynman's QED lectures.

A partial list of lectures is as follows:

References

Lecture series
University of Auckland